The Los Angeles County Department of Beaches and Harbors is responsible for 20 beaches and the Marina Del Rey small-craft harbor in Los Angeles County, California.

Marina
The department also manages the Marina Del Rey small-craft harbor, which has “4,600 boat slips in 23 marinas”  and brings in nearly $60 million annually in revenue. The Marina function was added by the Board of Supervisors in 1954. The department also operates Burton Chace Park, and  monitors raptor and waterbird nesting sites in Marina Del Rey's urban forest; tree trimmers wishing to work in the area must apply for a special permit.

Beaches
Management of the beaches was shifted from the Parks and Recreation department in May 1969. L.A. native Dick Fitzgerald was the first director of the Department of Beaches. In 1976, Fitzgerald advocated for marine reserves to protect the tide pool ecosystems at Abalone Cove and Vista Sudeste.

“The beaches surrounding Santa Monica Bay were visited by more than 42.5 million people in 1987,” according to the department's Lifeguard Division. The Los Angeles County Lifeguards became their own department in 1994.

The following beaches are owned or operated by the department, sometimes in partnership with the State of California or a city government:
 Dan Blocker Beach
 Dockweiler Beach
 El Sol Beach
 Hermosa Beach
 Las Tunas Beach
 Latigo Shores Beach
 Malibu Surfrider Beach
 Manhattan Beach
 Mother's Beach (aka Marina Beach)
 Nicholas Canyon Beach
 Point Dume Beach
 Point Fermin Beach
 Redondo Beach
 Topanga Beach
 Venice Beach
 White Point/Royal Palms Beach
 Will Rogers Beach
 Zuma Beach
Beaches and Harbors also runs the Dockweiler Beach RV parking and campground facilities, as well as Dockweiler Youth Center.

Misc.
“Safety operations on state waters in county territory” are also under the purview of the department.

The Beaches and Harbors Dept. collaborates with the Department of Public Works in the management of Ballona Creek and watershed, Malibu Lagoon and Oxford Basin.

See also
 Government of Los Angeles County, California

References

External links
 MAP of beaches owned or operated by L.A. County

Beaches of Los Angeles County, California
Government of Los Angeles County, California